Amazulu is the debut studio album of South African singer Amanda Black. It was released on 11 November 2016 through Ambitiouz Entertainment with music production credits from Christer, Ruff, Vuyo Manyike and Lunatik; and additional songwriting credits from Jabulani Makhubo, Christer Kobedi and Sizwe Thabethe. The 14-track album was nominated in five categories each at the 2016 Metro FM Music Awards and at the 23rd edition of the South African Music Awards.

Commercial performance
The album was certified platinum three weeks after its release which led Ngwako Malatji of Sunday World to name Amanda Black as "the new queen of ballads".

Track listing

Notes
"Kahle" - Keyboards by Christer • Bass and Guitars by Vuyo Manyike
"Uzobuya" - Bass by Elisha Dapo Kehinde
"Sabela" - Guitars by Vuyo Manyike
"Thank You" - Additional vocals by Vuyo Manyike

Sample credits 

"Lila" - Contains sample from "Baby I'm Missing You" by Blondie Makhene

Release history

Certifications

Accolades

References

2016 debut albums
Ambitiouz Entertainment albums
Amanda Black albums